Laraesima scutellaris is a species of beetle in the family Cerambycidae. It was described by Thomson in 1868. It is known from Argentina and Brazil.

References

Compsosomatini
Beetles described in 1868